The 2015 Men's South American Volleyball Club Championship was the seventh official edition of the men's volleyball tournament, played by seven teams from 11 to 15 February 2015 in San Juan, Argentina. The champions qualified for the 2015 Club World Championship.

Pools composition

Venue
 Estadio Aldo Cantoni, San Juan, Argentina

Preliminary round
All times are Argentina Time (UTC−03:00).

Pool A

|}

|}

Pool B

|}

|}

Final round
All times are Argentina Time (UTC−03:00).

5th–6th places

5th place match

|}

1st–4th places

Semifinals

|}

3rd place match

|}

Final

|}

Final standing

Awards

Most Valuable Player
  Nikolay Uchikov (UPCN San Juan)
Best Setter
  Demián González (UPCN San Juan)
Best Outside Spikers
  Yoandry Leal (Sada Cruzeiro)
  Lucas Ocampo (Lomas)

Best Middle Blockers
  Martín Ramos (UPCN San Juan)
  Facundo Imhoff (Lomas)
Best Opposite Spiker
  Wallace de Souza (Sada Cruzeiro)
Best Libero
  Sérgio Nogueira (Sada Cruzeiro)

External links
CSV

Volleyball
Men's South American Volleyball Club Championship
Volleyball
Men's South American Volleyball Club Championship